Custer National Forest is located primarily in the south central part of the U.S. state of Montana but also has separate sections in northwestern South Dakota. While in the westernmost sections, Custer National Forest is a part of the Greater Yellowstone Ecosystem, the easternmost sections are a combination of forest "islands" and grasslands. A portion of the forest is also part of the Absaroka-Beartooth Wilderness and constitutes over a third of the wilderness land. South of Red Lodge, Montana, the Beartooth Highway (U.S. 212) passes through the forest en route to Yellowstone National Park.

The eastern areas are dominated by large stands of ponderosa pine surrounded by grasslands, which are often leased to local ranchers for cattle grazing.

Administration
Since 2014, the Custer and Gallatin National Forests are managed together as the Custer-Gallatin National Forest with headquarters in Bozeman, Montana. There are local ranger district offices located in Ashland and Red Lodge in Montana, and in Camp Crook in South Dakota for Custer, and West Yellowstone, Livingston, Gardiner, and Bozeman in Montana for Gallatin.

Overview 

The western sections have a mixture of pine, spruce and fir trees due to the increased altitude and more abundant rainfall. Higher altitudes deep into the wilderness areas are above timberline and alpine conditions prevail. The tallest mountain in Montana, Granite Peak, is shared with Gallatin National Forest, as is the interesting Grasshopper Glacier, which has millions of grasshoppers that died approximately 300 years ago, entombed within the ice.

Within the forest are Native American burial grounds, pictographs and petroglyphs. For the plains Indians, the forest provided shelter and a stable food supply. Members of the Lewis and Clark Expedition are generally considered to be the first white Americans to visit the region.  The forest is currently divided into three Ranger Districts: Beartooth in Red Lodge, Montana; Ashland in Ashland, Montana; and Sioux in Camp Crook, South Dakota.  Four National Grasslands were formerly managed by the forest as the Grand River, Cedar River, Little Missouri and Sheyenne National Grasslands.  These units are now managed as the Dakota Prairie Grasslands, headquartered in Bismarck, ND.

There are over 30 vehicle accessible campgrounds in the forest, as well as numerous picnic areas. Over 1,500 miles (2,400 km) of hiking trails are available with most being found in the western district. Though not plentiful with rivers and lakes, the waterways do provide some opportunities for fishing but little for boating. The forest headquarters is located in Billings, Montana, and most hiking and camping is done in the region south and southwest of Billings. There are local ranger district offices in Ashland and Red Lodge in Montana, and in Camp Crook in South Dakota.

In descending order of land area the forest is located in parts of Powder River, Carbon, Stillwater, Rosebud, Carter, Sweet Grass, Harding (the only county in South Dakota), and Park counties. Only about 6.2% of the acreage lies in South Dakota.

Wildlife

A relatively rare type of small falcon known as the merlin is found here in greater concentrations than anywhere else in the United States. Mammalian species of coyote, bighorn sheep, marmot, mule deer, wolf packs, grizzly bear, moose, bobcat, pronghorn, cougar, mountain goat, black bear, elk, and bison.

History
Custer National Forest was established by the U.S. Forest Service as Otter National Forest on March 2, 1907.  On July 1, 1908 the name was changed to Custer.  On January 13, 1920 the entire Sioux National Forest was added, which now comprises the Sioux Ranger District of Custer, extending into South Dakota. Sioux had previously absorbed Cave Hills, Ekalaka, Long Pine, Short Pine and Slim Buttes National Forests on July 1, 1908. On February 17, 1932 Custer absorbed a portion of Beartooth National Forest, which now comprises the Beartooth District.

See also
Initial Rock
 List of forests in Montana

References

External links
 Custer Gallatin National Forest
 
 
 

 
National Forests of Montana
National Forests of South Dakota
National Forests of the Rocky Mountains
Greater Yellowstone Ecosystem
Protected areas of Carbon County, Montana
Protected areas of Stillwater County, Montana
Protected areas of Rosebud County, Montana
Protected areas of Carter County, Montana
Protected areas of Sweet Grass County, Montana
Protected areas of Harding County, South Dakota
Protected areas of Park County, Montana
1908 establishments in Montana
Protected areas established in 1908
1908 establishments in South Dakota